Lindsay Davenport and Mary Joe Fernández were the defending champions but lost in the quarterfinals to Marianne Werdel-Witmeyer and Tami Whitlinger-Jones.

Yayuk Basuki and Nicole Bradtke won in the final 5–7, 6–4, 6–4 against Werdel-Witmeyer and Whitlinger-Jones.

Seeds
Champion seeds are indicated in bold text while text in italics indicates the round in which those seeds were eliminated.

 Lindsay Davenport /  Mary Joe Fernández (quarterfinals)
 Yayuk Basuki /  Nicole Bradtke (champions)
 Alexia Dechaume-Balleret /  Sandrine Testud (semifinals)
 Laura Montalvo /  Paola Suárez (semifinals)

Draw

External links
 1996 Internationaux de Strasbourg Doubles Draw 

1996
1996 WTA Tour
1996 in French sport